Pancrate is a surname. Notable people with the surname include:

Fabrice Pancrate (born 1980), French footballer
Ludovic Pancrate (born 1987), French footballer